Acetryptine (INN) (developmental code name W-2965-A), also known as 5-acetyltryptamine (5-AT), is a drug described as an antihypertensive agent which was never marketed. Structurally, acetryptine is a substituted tryptamine, and is closely related to other substituted tryptamines like serotonin (5-hydroxytryptamine). It was developed in the early 1960s. The binding of acetryptine to serotonin receptors does not seem to have been well-investigated, although it was assessed at the 5-HT1A and 5-HT1D receptors and found to bind to them with high affinity. The drug may also act as a monoamine oxidase inhibitor (MAOI); specifically, as an inhibitor of MAO-A.

See also

 5-Benzyloxytryptamine
 5-Carboxamidotryptamine
 5-Ethoxy-DMT
 5-Methoxytryptamine
 5-(Nonyloxy)tryptamine
 Azepindole
 Indorenate
 Metralindole
 Pargyline
 Pirlindole
 Sumatriptan
 Tetrindole

References

Antihypertensive agents
Serotonin receptor agonists
Tryptamines